Esther Obeng Dapaah was the member of parliament for the constituency. She was elected on the ticket of the New Patriotic Party (NPP)
and won a majority of 5,889 votes to become the MP. She had represented the constituency in the 4th Republic parliament.

See also
List of Ghana Parliament constituencies

References

Parliamentary constituencies in the Eastern Region (Ghana)